The 1980 European Women Basketball Championship, commonly called EuroBasket Women 1980, was the 17th regional championship held by FIBA Europe. The competition was held in Yugoslavia and took place from 19 September to 28 September 1980.  won the gold medal and  the silver medal while  won the bronze.

Qualification

Group A

Group B

First stage

Group A

Group B

Group C

Second stage

Group A

Group B

9th to 14th positions Group

Play-off stages

Final standings

External links 
 FIBA Europe profile
 Todor66 profile

1980
1980 in Yugoslav women's sport
International women's basketball competitions hosted by Yugoslavia
September 1980 sports events in Europe
Euro
1980–81 in Yugoslav basketball
Sport in Banja Luka